Negative value may refer to:
Negative predictive value in statistics
Negative ethic or philosophic value
Negative pricing
insolvency